The 2018–19 UC Davis Aggies men's basketball team represented the University of California, Davis in the 2018–19 NCAA Division I men's basketball season. The Aggies were led by eighth-year head coach Jim Les and competed at The Pavilion. UC Davis was a member of the Big West Conference, and participated in their 12th consecutive season in that league.

Before the season

The Aggies finished 22–11 overall, and 12–4 in the conference. During the season, the Aggies participated in the Las Vegas Classic under the visitors division, which was held in San Francisco, California, Reno, Nevada, and Las Vegas, Nevada. The Aggies finished in 2nd place by defeating Lamar but losing to Radford. Prior to the tournament, UC Davis lost at San Francisco and at Nevada as friendly matches. UC Davis also defeated rival Sacramento State in the Sacramento Showcase in Sacramento, California. In the postseason, UC Davis defeated UC Riverside but lost to Cal State Fullerton in the semifinals of the 2018 Big West Conference men's basketball tournament in Anaheim, California. In addition, the Aggies participated in the 2018 National Invitation Tournament, where they lost to Utah in Salt Lake City, Utah in the first round.

Roster

Schedule

|-
!colspan=12 style=""| Non–conference regular season

|-
!colspan=12 style=""| Big West regular season

|-
!colspan=12 style=""| Big West tournament

References

UC Davis
UC Davis Aggies men's basketball seasons
UC Davis
UC Davis